Cicindela pimeriana, the Cochise tiger beetle, is a species of flashy tiger beetle in the family Carabidae. It is found in North America.

References

Further reading

 
 

pimeriana
Articles created by Qbugbot
Beetles described in 1867